Phastos is a fictional character appearing in American comic books published by Marvel Comics. Created by Peter B. Gillis and Sal Buscema, the character first appeared in The Eternals (vol. 2) #1 (October 1985). He is a member of the Eternals, a human offshoot race in the Marvel Universe.

Brian Tyree Henry portrays Phastos in the Marvel Cinematic Universe film Eternals (2021).

Publication history

Phastos first appeared in The Eternals (vol. 2) #1 (October 1985), created by writer Peter B. Gillis and artist Sal Buscema.

Fictional character biography
Phastos's history is very murky. He is a third or fourth generation Eternal who chose to remain on Earth because of his obsessive search for an unidentified item or person. He continues to serve as the master technologist for the Eternal race, and it was his genius which allowed Virako to return from apparent death. Although he despises war, Phastos chose to follow Ikaris into battle against the minions of Apocalypse.

Phastos is shown living under the name Phillip Stoss, before having his real identity revealed to him.

Powers and abilities
As an Eternal, Phastos has superhuman speed, strength, durability, and is immortal. He can project "Cosmic Energy" in the form of beams from his eyes and hands. His cosmic energy manipulation allows flight, illusion generation, matter transmutation, and teleportation.

Phastos carries a special hammer capable of firing bolts of an unknown energy and is a brilliant engineer, technologist and inventor.

In other media

Film
 Phastos appears in Eternals, portrayed by Brian Tyree Henry. He is an Eternal and an intelligent weapons and technology inventor. He is the first superhero to be depicted as gay in an MCU film. Phastos was sent to Earth in 5,000 BC to progress the planet's societal development, and protect it from the Deviants. He guided and progressed many technological revolutions throughout the course of human history, but fell into a state of dejection when he realized that the tools he introduced to humanity were used in August 1945 to create the first atom bomb which resulted in monumental loss of human life. Blaming himself, he grew distant from his fellow Eternals. In the present day, Phastos settled and started a family with his husband Ben and they raised a son named Jack. He met again with the Eternals to prevent a new wave of Deviants led by Kro, and realized their true purpose; to pave the way for the Emergence of Earth, which would lead to the birth of Tiamut and result in the destruction of the planet. The Eternals were divided, with Phastos sidestepping to protect the planet and prevent the Emergence from occurring. By choosing to save the planet and its occupants rather than allow the Emergence to occur, Phastos was abducted from Earth by Arishem (who plans to observe their memories to see if humanity is worthy enough to live) to places unknown.

Notes

References

 Phastos at the Marvel Directory

External links
 The Eternals at the Marvel Universe
 Phastos at the Marvel Database Project

Characters created by Sal Buscema
Comics characters introduced in 1985
Eternals (comics)
Fictional characters with superhuman durability or invulnerability
Fictional engineers
Fictional hammer fighters
Fictional inventors
Fictional LGBT characters in film
Marvel Comics characters who can move at superhuman speeds
Marvel Comics characters who can teleport
Marvel Comics characters with accelerated healing
Marvel Comics characters with superhuman strength
Marvel Comics LGBT superheroes